Michael McCausland Gibbs (1 September 1900 – 27 July 1962) was an eminent Anglican clergyman in the third quarter  of the 20th century.

Gibbs was the son of Reginald Gibbs and his wife, Laura McCausland of Drenagh. His father was Vicar of Clifton Hampden. He was educated at Lancing and Keble College, Oxford. In 1926, he was ordained and began as curate at St. Mary's Church, Putney

He moved to Rhodesia where he was Chaplain to Edward Francis Paget, Bishop of Southern Rhodesia, then Rector of Bulawayo and finally the Archdeacon of Matabeleland.

Moving to South Africa, he was then Rector of St Saviour, Claremont, Cape Town and after that Dean of Cape Town. In 1954 he returned to England and was Dean of Chester until his death.

Family
Gibbs married Edith Marjorie Ward, daughter of Mr and Mrs John Ward of Long Wittenham.

References

1900 births
People educated at Lancing College
Alumni of Keble College, Oxford
Alumni of Ripon College Cuddesdon
Archdeacons of Matabeleland
Deans of Cape Town
Deans of Chester
1962 deaths